Hernán Enrique Pertúz Ortega (born March 31, 1989) is a Colombian footballer who currently plays as a defender.

Club career
Pertúz began his career in the youth ranks of top Colombian club Independiente Medellín. He made his first team debut on November 27, 2011 in a 3-4 loss to Once Caldas. During the 2009 season Pertúz helped Medellín to a first-place finish in the Torneo Finalización and a Copa Mustang II title.  On January 3, 2011, Pertúz signed with FC Dallas of Major League Soccer.

On December 20, 2012, after making 30 appearances and scoring one goal in what turned out to be his loan stint with Dallas, it was announced that Pertúz had not come into terms with Dallas and would be returning to Independiente. After a spinal injury in June 2018, Pertúz was out for a year and one week. In May 2020 the club confirmed, that Partúz wouldn't get his contract extended and would leave the club on 30 June 2020.

International career
Hernán Pertúz was a member of the Colombia national under-20 football team that participated in the 2009 South American Youth Championship. He was a key player for the side scoring three goals in the competition.

References

External links
 
 

1989 births
Living people
Colombian footballers
Colombian expatriate footballers
Independiente Medellín footballers
FC Dallas players
Categoría Primera A players
Major League Soccer players
Association football defenders
Footballers from Barranquilla
Colombian expatriate sportspeople in the United States
Expatriate soccer players in the United States